Oeax tricuspis is a species of beetle in the family Cerambycidae. It was described by Báguena in 1952.

References

Ancylonotini
Beetles described in 1952